George "Elfie" Ballis (August 12, 1925 – September 24, 2010) was an American photographer and activist who advocated on behalf of migrant farm workers in California, and took tens of thousands of photographs documenting the efforts of César Chávez, the Mexican American labor leader who founded the United Farm Workers.

Early life and education

Ballis was born on August 12, 1925, the son of Greek and German immigrants, and was raised in Faribault, Minnesota. He enlisted in the United States Marine Corps during World War II and served in the South Pacific as a mechanic repairing torpedo bombers. After completing his military service, he earned an undergraduate degree from the University of Minnesota and became involved in radical politics, joining the Student World Federalists. Ballis originally majored in electrical engineering, but despite his strong abilities in math and science he changed direction and eventually graduated with a double major in journalism and political science.

Career

One of his first jobs was at U.S. Rubber, where a manager told him that he "had to have a U.S. Rubber attitude... ready to go anywhere at anytime" but found that he "didn't have the U.S. Rubber attitude." After his car broke down while he was on vacation in San Francisco, Ballis decided to live there and took a job writing headlines for article in The Wall Street Journal, where he was called in by his boss about his use of creative phrasing.

While working as an editor of a labor newspaper in the 1950s, Ballis took a photography course taught by Dorothea Lange, a photographer and photojournalist who had documented the Great Depression in her photos. He started taking pictures on his own, photographing migrant workers and showing the substandard housing and working conditions that they endured, saying "I wanted my photographs to reflect to them the power and dignity they had". Ballis made an effort to familiarize himself with his subjects before taking their pictures, a process by which he was able to take pictures having gained the respect of this he was photographing. Thousands of Ballis's photos captured the efforts of Cesar Chavez to organize Latino workers, leading to the formation of the United Farm Workers. Works by Ballis depicting protests and marches appeared in such publications as Life, Newsweek, Time, The New York Times and The Washington Post. Labor historian Richard Steven Street called Ballis's work "activist photography with a point of view" and credited him as being one of a small number of freelance photographers who brought Chávez the public attention he needed to succeed in his efforts.

As director of National Land for People, Ballis opposed a June 1980 decision by the United States Supreme Court that ruled that a 1902 law limiting irrigated farms to  did not apply in the Imperial Valley. Ballis called the decision "Morally, legally, socially, politically and economically, a bankrupt decision", saying that there were a disproportionate number of large corporate and foreign-owned farms that benefited from federal subsidies for irrigation, and Ballis expressed concern that the ruling could lead to the repeal of such limits in other agricultural areas of California. While directing the National Land for People, Ballis made a 23-minute film titled The Richest Land that juxtaposed small farmers and corporate farmers, and Jessie Lopez De La Cruz and Dolores Huerta both made cameos.

Death

A resident of Tollhouse, California, Ballis died at age 85 on September 24, 2010, at the Veterans Affairs Medical Center in Fresno, California, where he had been treated for prostate cancer.

References

1925 births
2010 deaths
Photographers from California
United States Marine Corps personnel of World War II
People from Fresno County, California
Deaths from cancer in California
Deaths from prostate cancer
United States Marines
University of Minnesota alumni
20th-century American photographers
People from Faribault, Minnesota